

274001–274100 

|-id=020
| 274020 Skywalker ||  || Skywalker is the family name of the fictional characters Luke and Anakin in the Star Wars universe. || 
|-id=084
| 274084 Baldone ||  || Baldone, a city in the southwest of Riga. || 
|}

274101–274200 

|-id=137
| 274137 Angelaglinos ||  || Angela Glinos (born 1962), a Canadian computer scientist, who has successfully balanced a career at Bell Labs and the University of Toronto while raising three daughters and supporting her husband's astronomical interests. || 
|}

274201–274300 

|-id=213
| 274213 Satriani ||  || Joe Satriani (born 1956), an American rock guitarist and top guitar virtuoso, who was recruited by Mick Jagger and then toured with Deep Purple as the lead guitarist || 
|-id=246
| 274246 Reggiacaserta ||  || The Royal Palace of Caserta ("Reggia Caserta") is a former royal residence in southern Italy, constructed for the Bourbon kings of Naples. It is one of the largest palaces erected in Europe during the 18th century. The palace was designated a World Heritage Site by UNESCO in 1997. || 
|-id=264
| 274264 Piccolomini ||  || Alessandro Piccolomini (1508–1578/79), an Italian astronomer and archbishop, who created the first modern celestial atlas, De le stelle fisse  (The sphere of the world and The fixed stars) in 1540. The lunar crater Piccolomini is also  named after him. || 
|-id=300
| 274300 UNESCO ||  || UNESCO, the United Nations Educational, Scientific and Cultural Organization, a specialized agency of the United Nations || 
|}

274301–274400 

|-
| 274301 Wikipedia ||  || Wikipedia, a free, copyleft, collaboratively edited online encyclopedia that was launched in 2001 || 
|-id=302
| 274302 Abaházi ||  || Richard Abaházi (1907–1977), a Hungarian engineer who worked at Konkoly Observatory between 1935 and 1940. He made regular observations of occultations, and photographed comets and asteroids. || 
|-id=333
| 274333 Voznyukigor ||  || Igor Mykolayovych Voznyuk (born 1964), a graduate of the Faculty of Physical Department of the Kyiv University, is an optician by profession. || 
|-id=334
| 274334 Kyivplaniy ||  || Kyiv Planetarium in Kyiv, Ukraine, one of the country's leading cultural and educational centers to promote astronomy.
|}

274401–274500 

|-id=472
| 274472 Pietà ||  || The Vatican Pietà is a white Carrara marble sculpture by Michelangelo Buonarroti, kept in the Basilica of St. Peter in Vatican City. This was the first masterpiece by the young Michelangelo, and it considered one of the greatest works of art. || 
|}

274501–274600 

|-bgcolor=#f2f2f2
| colspan=4 align=center | 
|}

274601–274700 

|-bgcolor=#f2f2f2
| colspan=4 align=center | 
|}

274701–274800 

|-bgcolor=#f2f2f2
| colspan=4 align=center | 
|}

274801–274900 

|-id=810
| 274810 Fedáksári ||  || Sári Fedák (1879–1955), a Hungarian actress and singer, one of the most well known prima donnas of her time. || 
|-id=835
| 274835 Aachen ||  || The German city of Aachen. It developed from a Roman settlement and spa, was the preferred medieval Imperial residence of Charlemagne, and, from 936 to 1531, the Aachen Cathedral was the coronation church for thirty German kings. || 
|-id=843
| 274843 Mykhailopetrenko ||  || Mykhailo Petrenko (1817–1862), a Ukrainian romantic poet. Some of his poems were set to music and became very popular folk songs. || 
|-id=856
| 274856 Rosendosalvado ||  || Rosendo Salvado (1814–1900), a Spanish monk, missionary and bishop, who, in 1847, founded the Benedictine community in New Norcia, Australia. The town now hosts the New Norcia Station, ESA's deep space ground station with a 35-meter dish, built specifically to communicate with the Rosetta space probe. || 
|-id=860
| 274860 Emilylakdawalla ||  || Emily Lakdawalla (born 1975), an American planetary geologist and awarded science communicator || 
|}

274901–275000 

|-id=981
| 274981 Petrsu ||  || Petrozavodsk State University in the Republic of Karelia, Russia || 
|}

References 

274001-275000